Malia (stylized as MALIA, born 1 February 1983, in Kōhoku-ku, Yokohama, Kanagawa Prefecture) is a Japanese fashion model. She is represented by Ten Carat.

Personal life

Malia was born on 1 February 1983 in Yokohama. She is of Pakistani descent through her father and Japanese through her mother.

In 2001, she married Japanese footballer, Hayuma Tanaka. Their son Kaili Shimbo, born 16 August 2002, is a professional footballer for Renofa Yamaguchi. They divorced in 2004.

Filmography

Magazines

Advertising

TV programmes

TV dramas

Bibliography

References

External links
 – Ten Carat 
 – Ameba Blog 
 
 
 
 
 – Line 

Japanese female models
Japanese people of Pakistani descent
People from Yokohama
1983 births
Living people